Frank James Wintle (20 December 1929 – 4 January 2005) was an English footballer who played as a defender. He was signed to Port Vale from 1949 to 1957, but only played the one league game. He later moved on to Crewe Alexandra.

Career
Wintle joined Port Vale in May 1949, but was never given a game by Gordon Hodgson, Ivor Powell, Freddie Steele, or Norman Low. The only time he featured in the first team was a brief period between Steele's resignation and Low's appointment as manager. After eight years at the club, now aged 27, Wintle made his only appearance for the "Valiants" at right-back in a 7–1 thrashing by Nottingham Forest at Vale Park on 2 February 1957. Forest's outside-left Stewart Imlach gave Wintle a very difficult afternoon. At the end of the 1956–57 season Vale were relegated out of the Second Division. He was given a free transfer in May 1957 and moved on to Crewe Alexandra. He never made his debut for the "Railwaymen". He joined Macclefield Town but played just four games in the Cheshire County League.

Career statistics
Source:

References

1929 births
2005 deaths
Footballers from Stoke-on-Trent
English footballers
Association football defenders
Port Vale F.C. players
Crewe Alexandra F.C. players
Macclesfield Town F.C. players
English Football League players